Filasterea is a proposed basal Filozoan clade that includes Ministeria and Capsaspora. It is a sister clade to the Choanozoa in which the Choanoflagellatea and Animals appeared. Originally proposed by Shalchian-Tabrizi et al. in 2008, based on a phylogenomic analysis with dozens of genes. Filasterea was found to be the sister-group to the clade composed of Metazoa and Choanoflagellata within the Opisthokonta, a finding that has been further corroborated with additional, more taxon-rich, phylogenetic analyses.

Etymology
From Latin filum meaning "thread" and 
Greek aster meaning "star", it indicates the main morphological features shared by all their integrants: small, rounded amoeboids with a mononucleated cellular body, covered in long and radiating cell protrusions known as filopodia.  These filopodia may be involved in substrate adhesion and capture of prey.

Applications
There are currently cultures from two filasterean species: Capsaspora owczarzaki and Ministeria vibrans, the first isolated from within a fresh-water snail, the second a marine, free-living bacteriovore. The complete genome sequence of C. owczarzaki has been obtained  and the genome sequence of M. vibrans is being sequenced. Comparative analyses have shown that Filasterea are key to unravel the genetic repertoire of the unicellular ancestor of animals and to provide insights into the origin of Metazoa. Metabarcoding analyses of 18S ribosomal RNA in marine environments have failed to recover other filasterean representatives, suggesting this clade may not be especially abundant in natural ecosystems.

Taxonomy
 Class Filasterea Shalchian-Tabrizi et al. 2008
 Order Ministeriida Cavalier-Smith 1997
 Family Ministeriidae Cavalier-Smith 2008
 Genus Ministeria Patterson et al. 1993
 Ministeria marisola Patterson et al. 1993
 Ministeria vibrans Tong 1997
 Family Capsasporidae Cavalier-Smith 2008
 Genus Capsaspora Hertel et al. 2002
 Capsaspora owczarzaki Hertel et al. 2002
 Genus Pigoraptor Tikhonenkov et al. 2017
 Pigoraptor chileana Tikhonenkov et al. 2017
 Pigoraptor vietnamica Tikhonenkov et al. 2017

In some research Capsaspora is found to be more closely related to Choanozoa than Ministeria.

References

 
Opisthokont classes
Monotypic eukaryote classes